Coronel Arnold is a small town (comuna) in the province of Santa Fe, Argentina.

References
 

Populated places in Santa Fe Province

pt:Anexo:Lista de municípios de Santa Fé#Comunas